Jonathan Parker Fisher was Archdeacon of Barnstaple during 1805: he was later Sub-Dean of Exeter Cathedral.

References

Archdeacons of Barnstaple